Delta Junction Airport  is a public use airport located in and owned by Delta Junction, a city in the Southeast Fairbanks Census Area of the U.S. state of Alaska.

As per Federal Aviation Administration records, the airport had 252 passenger boardings (enplanements) in calendar year 2008, and 350 enplanements in 2010.

Facilities and aircraft 
Delta Junction Airport covers an area of 80 acres (32 ha) at an elevation of 1,150 feet (351 m) above mean sea level. It has two runways: 7/25 is 2,500 by 60 feet (762 x 18 m) with a gravel surface and 13/31 is 1,600 by 60 feet (488 x 18 m) with a dirt surface. There are 16 aircraft based at this airport: 94% single-engine and 6% multi-engine.

Airline and destinations 

The following airline offers scheduled passenger service at this airport:

See also 
 Allen Army Airfield  at

References

External links 

 Aerial photo as of June 1999 from USGS The National Map

Airports in the Southeast Fairbanks Census Area, Alaska